Jonathon Gary Margetts (born 28 September 1993) is an English professional footballer who plays as a forward for Stamford.

Having started his career with Hull City he failed to make a first team appearance, but over a two-year period he notably spent brief spells playing in the Football League for Cambridge United, Tranmere Rovers, Lincoln City and Scunthorpe United. He has since fallen out of contention in the professional game where he has played at Non-League level for Gainsborough Trinity, Harrogate Town, Stockport County, Altrincham, Southport,  Boston United, Matlock Town, Tadcaster Albion and Frickley Athletic.

Career

Hull City
Born in Doncaster, South Yorkshire, Margetts was a Hull City youth graduate. In July 2012, he progressed through the youth ranks into the first team and signed his first professional contract. On 27 February 2014, he joined Gainsborough Trinity in a one-month loan deal.

Margetts scored 10 goals in only 13 league appearances for Gainsborough, including a hat-trick in a 6–0 home win over Oxford City on 12 April. He returned to Hull in the summer, but was loaned to Harrogate Town on 18 August.

On 23 December 2014, Margetts returned to Gainsborough, also on a loan deal. On 13 March 2015, he joined Cambridge United on loan until the end of the season. Margetts made his professional debut on the following day, coming on as a second-half substitute in a 1–1 League Two home draw against Stevenage.

Tranmere Rovers
Following a successful pre-season trial and scoring five goals in three games, Margetts signed a one-year deal with National League club Tranmere Rovers. He joined National League North club Stockport County on loan on 27 November 2015, where he scored four goals from seven appearances. He joined National League side Altrincham on a one-month loan on 23 January 2016. On 22 March 2016, Margetts joined National League team Southport on loan for the rest of the 2015–16 season.

Lincoln City
On 14 July 2016, Margetts joined National League club Lincoln City on a one-year contract, following a successful trial.

Scunthorpe United
After scoring five goals in seven matches for Lincoln, Margetts signed for League One club Scunthorpe United on 31 August 2016 on a two-year contract for an undisclosed fee. He scored his first goal for Scunthorpe on his debut in an EFL Trophy tie against Shrewsbury Town on 4 October 2016. A loan move to Crewe Alexandra fell through in early February 2017. On 1 March 2017, Margetts rejoined Lincoln City on loan until the end of 2016–17.

Boston United
On 2 July 2018 Margetts joined Boston United.

On 23 October 2018 he returned to Gainsborough Trinity on loan for three months. He returned to Boston United in mid January 2019, but was loaned out again on 30 January, this time to Matlock Town for one month. In the beginning of March 2019, Margetts joined the same club on loan once again, this time until the end of the season.

Frickley Athletic
After a short spell at Tadcaster Albion, Margetts joined Frickley Athletic in September 2019. He was made club captain in July 2020.

In May 2021, Margetts announced that he was leaving the club.

Career statistics

References

External links
Jonny Margetts profile at the Scunthorpe United F.C. website

1993 births
Living people
Footballers from Doncaster
English footballers
Association football forwards
Hull City A.F.C. players
Gainsborough Trinity F.C. players
Harrogate Town A.F.C. players
Cambridge United F.C. players
Tranmere Rovers F.C. players
Stockport County F.C. players
Altrincham F.C. players
Southport F.C. players
Lincoln City F.C. players
Scunthorpe United F.C. players
Boston United F.C. players
Matlock Town F.C. players
Tadcaster Albion A.F.C. players
Frickley Athletic F.C. players
National League (English football) players
English Football League players